John P. Kelly is a convening apostle of the International Coalition of Apostolic Leaders.

External links
 International Coalition of Apostles
 International Coalition of Apostolic Leaders
 European Coalition of Apostolic Leaders
 John P. Kelly Ministries

American Christian clergy
Living people
Year of birth missing (living people)
Place of birth missing (living people)